The 2018–19 figure skating season began on July 1, 2018, and ended on June 30, 2019. During this season, elite skaters competed at the ISU Championship level in the 2019 European, Four Continents, World Junior, and World Championships. They also competed in elite events such as the Grand Prix series and Junior Grand Prix series, culminating in the Grand Prix Final, and the ISU Challenger Series.

Season notes

Age eligibility 
Skaters are eligible to compete in ISU events at the junior or senior levels according to their age:

Changes 

If skaters of different nationalities team up, the ISU requires that they choose one country to represent.Date refers to date when the change occurred or, if not available, the date when the change was announced.

Partnership changes

Retirements

Coaching changes

Nationality changes

Competitions 

Scheduled competitions:

Key

International medalists

Men

Ladies

Pairs

Ice dance 

* Anastasia Shakun / Daniil Ragimov were disqualified for Shakun's violation of anti-doping rules.

Season's best scores

Men

Best total score

Best short program score

Best free skating score

Ladies

Best total score

Best short program score

Best free skating score

Pairs

Best total score

Best short program score

Best free skating score

Ice dance

Best total score

Best rhythm dance score

Best free dance score

Standings and ranking

Current standings (top 30)

Men's singles 
.

Ladies' singles 
.

Pairs 
.

Ice dance 
.

References

External links 
 International Skating Union

Seasons in figure skating